The 1993 FIBA Americas Championship for Women, was the second FIBA Americas Championship for Women regional basketball championship held by FIBA Americas, which also served as Americas qualifier for the 1994 FIBA World Championship for Women, granting berths to the top four teams in the final standings. It was held in Brazil between 26 June and 4 July 1993. Eight national teams entered the event under the auspices of FIBA Americas, the sport's regional governing body. The city of São Paulo hosted the tournament. The United States won their first title after defeating hosts Brazil in the final.

Format
Teams were split into two round-robin groups of four teams each. The top two teams from each group advanced to the second stage and qualified directly to the 1994 FIBA World Championship for Women. The second stage consisted of another round robin group of four teams, where the top two teams played an extra game for the championship, and the other two teams played for third place.
The teams that did not advance to the second round were cross-paired (3A vs. 3B, 4A vs. 4B) and played an extra game to define fifth through eighth place in the final standings.

Qualification
Eight teams qualified during the qualification tournaments held in their respective zones in 1993; two teams (USA and Canada) qualified automatically since they are the only members of the North America zone.
North America: , 
Caribbean and Central America:, 

First round

Group A

|}

Group B

|}

Classification stage

Fifth place

Seventh place

Second stage

|}

Third place

Final

Final standings

External links
Women Basketball America World Qualification 1993, todor66.com. Retrieved January 22, 2015.

FIBA Women's AmeriCup
1993 in women's basketball
1993–94 in Brazilian basketball
International women's basketball competitions hosted by Brazil
1993–94 in North American basketball
1993–94 in South American basketball